This list of the Cenozoic life of New Jersey contains the various prehistoric life-forms whose fossilized remains have been reported from within the US state of New Jersey and are between 66 million and 10,000 years of age.

A

 †Acanthionella
 †Acanthionella simplex
 Acanthodesia
 †Acanthodesia savarti
  †Acrodus
 †Acrodus humilus
 Actaeonema
 †Actaeonema priscum
 Acteocina
 †Acteocina canaliculata
 †Acteocina kirkwoodiana – type locality for species
  Aetobatus
 †Aetobatus irregularis
 †Agabelus – type locality for genus
 †Agabelus porcatus – type locality for species
 Aligena
 †Aligena elevata
 †Ambigostrea
 †Ambigostrea tecticosta
 †Ammodon
 †Ammodon leidyanum – type locality for species
 Amphiblestrum
 †Amphiblestrum heteropora
  Amyda
 †Amyda lima – type locality for species
 †Amyda pennata – type locality for species
 Anachis
 †Anachis avara
 Anadara
 †Anadara lienosa
 †Anadara ovalis
  †Anadara transversa
 †Anchippodus
 †Anchippodus riparius
 Angulus
 †Angulus agilis
 †Angulus producta
 Anomia
 †Anomia simplex
 †Araloselachus
 †Araloselachus cuspidata
 Arca
 †Arca improcera
 †Arca millvillensis
 †Arca quindecemradiata
  Architectonica
 †Architectonica annosa
 Argopecten
 †Argopecten gibbus
  †Argopecten irradians
  Argyrotheca
 †Argyrotheca beecheri
  Astarte
 †Astarte castanea
 †Astarte castanella
 †Astarte cuneiformis
 †Astarte distans
 †Astarte perplana
 †Astarte planimarginata
 †Astarte symmetrica
 †Astarte thomasii
 †Astarte undulata
 Astrangia
 †Astrangia danae
 Astyris
 †Astyris communis
 †Astyris lunata
 Athleta
 †Athleta abbotti
 †Athleta cancellatus
 Atrina
 †Atrina rostriformis
  †Aturia
 †Aturia vanuxemi
 †Aturoidea
 †Aturoidea paucifex – type locality for species
 †Aturoidea pilsbryi – type locality for species

B

 Balanophyllia
 †Balanophyllia inauris – type locality for species
  Balanus
 Barbatia
 †Barbatia marylandica
 Barnea
 †Barnea truncata
 †Bathosella
 †Bathosella aspera
 Bathytormus
 †Bathytormus alaeformis
 †Belosphys
 Bicorbula
 †Bicorbula idonea
  Bison
 †Bonellitia – or unidentified comparable form
 †Bonellitia rudis
 †Bootherium
  †Bootherium bombifrons
 Buccinum
 †Buccinum undatum
 †Bulliopsis
 †Bulliopsis integra
 Busycon
 †Busycon carica
 †Busycon perversum
 Busycotypus
 †Busycotypus canaliculatus

C

 Cadulus
 †Cadulus conradi
  †Calappilia
 Callianassa – tentative report
 Calliostoma
 †Calliostoma eboreum
 †Calliostoma tullneri
 Calyptraea
 †Calyptraphorus
 †Calyptraphorus jacksoni
 Carcharias
 †Carcharias teretidens
 Carcharodon
  †Carcharodon hastalis
 Cardita
 †Cardita aculeata
 Carditamera
 †Carditamera arata
  Cardites
 †Cardites antiquata
 
 †Cardium knappi
 †Cardium nucleolum
 †Caricella
 †Caricella lelia
 †Caricella plicata
 †Caricella ponderosa
 †Caricella vesta
 †Carinorbis
 †Carinorbis dalli
 †Carolinapecten
 †Carolinapecten eboreus
 Caryocorbula
 †Caryocorbula contracta
  †Castoroides
 †Catopygus
 †Catopygus oviformis
 Cavilinga
 †Cavilinga trisulcata
 †Cavoscala
 †Cavoscala annulata
 Cerithiopsis
 †Cerithiopsis emersonii
  †Cervalces
 Chaetopleura
 †Chaetopleura apiculata
 Chama
 †Chama congregata
 †Cheilophis
 †Cheilophis huerfanoensis
 Cheilopora – tentative report
 †Cheilopora jabiosa
 Chelone
 †Chelone parvitecta – type locality for species
 †Chesacardium
 †Chesacardium craticuloides
 †Chesacardium laqueatum
  †Chesapecten
 †Chesapecten madisonius
 Chionopsis
 †Chionopsis intapurpurea
 Chlamys
 †Chlamys kneiskerni
 †Chlamys rigbyi
  Cidaris
 †Cidaris splendens – type locality for species
 †Cistella
 †Cistella plicatilis
  Clavilithes
 †Clavilithes hercules
 †Clavilithes nobilis
 †Clavilithes paucicostatus
 †Clavilithes propinquus
 †Clavilithes samsoni
 Clementia
 †Clementia inoceriformis
 Cliona – tentative report
 Conus
 †Conus sauridens
  Corbula
 †Corbula elevata
 †Corbula ima
 †Corbula inaequalis
 †Corbula nasutoides
 †Coscinopleura
 †Coscinopleura digitata
 Crassatella
 †Crassatella compressirostrea
 †Crassatella conradi
 †Crassatella littoralis
 †Crassatella obliquata
 †Crassatella rhombea
 †Crassatella vadosa
 Crassinella
 †Crassinella lunulata
 †Crassinella profundorum
  Crassostrea
 †Crassostrea virginica
 Crenella
 †Crenella glandula
 Crepidula
 †Crepidula convexa
  †Crepidula fornicata
 †Crepidula plana
  †Cretolamna
 †Cretolamna appendiculata
 †Crocodilus
 †Crocodilus basitruncatus – type locality for species
  Crocodylus
 †Crocodylus clavirostris – type locality for species
 †Crommyodus
 †Crommyodus irregularis
 Crucibulum
 †Crucibulum costata
  †Crucibulum striatum
 †Cryphaeostrea
 †Cryphaeostrea vomer
 †Ctenocella
 †Ctenocella rutgersensis
 †Cubitostrea
 †Cubitostrea linguafelis
  Cucullaea
 †Cucullaea antrosa
 †Cucullaea compressirostra
 †Cucullaea macrodonta
 †Cucullaea vulgaris
 Cumingia
 †Cumingia tellinoides
 Cuspidaria
 †Cuspidaria aequivalvis
 Cyclocardia
 †Cyclocardia granulata
 Cylichna
 †Cylichna conica
 †Cylindracanthus
 †Cylindracanthus acus
 †Cylindracanthus rectus
 Cythara – tentative report
 Cytherea

D

 †Dallarca
 †Dallarca idonea
 †Dallarca staminea
 †Dallarca subrostrata
  Dasyatis
 †Dasyatis crosswickense – type locality for species
 Dentalina
 †Dentalina fissicostata – or unidentified comparable form
 Dentalium
 †Dhondtichlamys
 †Dhondtichlamys delawarensis – type locality for species
 Diaperoecia
 †Diaperoecia varians
 Diastoma
 †Diastoma insulaemaris
  †Diatryma
 †Diatryma regens
  †Diceratherium
 †Diceratherium matutinum
 Diodora
 †Diodora griscomi
 Diplodonta
 †Diplodonta acclinis
 †Diplodonta punctata
 †Diplodonta shilohensis
 Diplosolen
 †Diplosolen compactum
 Discinisca
 †Discinisca lugubris
 Divalinga
 †Divalinga quadrisulcata
 †Dolicholatirus
 †Dolicholatirus eocenensis
 †Dollochelys
 Donax
 †Donax abesconi
 †Donax fossor
  Dosinia
 †Dosinia acetabulum
 †Dromiopsis
 †Dromiopsis americana

E

 Echinarachnius
  †Echinocorys
 †Echinocorys ovalis – type locality for species
  †Echinopsis
 †Echinopsis diatreta – type locality for species
  †Ecphora
 †Ecphora tricostata
 Edaphodon
 †Edaphodon agassizi
 †Edaphodon eocaenus
 †Edaphodon mantelli
 Ellisina
 †Ellisina angusta
 †Ellisina spiculosa
 †Emballorhynchus – type locality for genus
 †Emballorhynchus kinnei – type locality for species
 †Enchodus
 †Enchodus ferox
 Endopachys
  Ensis
 †Ensis directus
 †Eocypraea
 †Eocypraea sabuloviridis
 Eontia
 †Eontia palmerae
 †Eontia ponderosa
 †Eopleurotoma – tentative report
 †Eopleurotoma altispira
 †Eopleurotoma regularicostata
  †Eosphargis
 †Eosphargis insularis – type locality for species
  †Eosuchus
 †Eosuchus minor – type locality for species
 Epitonium
 †Epitonium annulatum
 †Epitonium humphreysii
 †Epitonium rupicola
 †Epitonium tenuiliratum
 Equus
 Ervilia
 †Etea
 †Etea delawarensis
 †Etea delwarensis
 Eupleura
 †Eupleura caudata
 †Euritina
 †Euritina torta
 Euspira
 †Euspira halli
 †Euspira heros
 †Euspira triseriata
 †Eutrephoceras
 †Eutrophoceras
 †Eutrophoceras dekayi

F

 Falsifusus
 †Falsifusus hector
  Fasciolaria – report made of unidentified related form or using admittedly obsolete nomenclature
 †Fasciolaria crookiana
 Flabellum
 †Flabellum cuneiformis
 †Flabellum mortoni – type locality for species
 †Florimetis
 †Florimetis biplicata
 Fossarus – tentative report
 †Fossarus lyra

G

  Galeocerdo
 †Galeocerdo aduncus
 †Galeocerdo egertonii
 Galeodea
 †Gauthieria
 †Gauthieria speciosa – type locality for species
 Gemma
 †Gemma gemma
 Geukensia
 †Geukensia demissa
 Ginglymostoma
 †Ginglymostoma obliquum
 Glans
 †Glans intermedia
  †Glomerula
 †Glomerula vincentownensis
 Glossus
 †Glossus conradi
 †Glossus vetus
  Glycymeris
 †Glycymeris conradi
 †Glycymeris parilis
 †Glycymeris subaustralis
 †Gorgonella
 †Graphaeostrea
 †Graphaeostrea vomer
 †Graphularia
 †Graphularia ambigua
  †Gryphaea
 †Gryphaea dissimilaris
 †Gryphaeostrea
 †Gryphaeostrea vomer
 Gyrodes

H

 †Hadranderaster
 †Hadranderaster asperulus
 †Hamulus – or unidentified comparable form
 †Hamulus falcatus
 Haustator – or unidentified comparable form
 †Haustator elongatus
 Hemiaster
 †Hemiaster parastatus – type locality for species
 †Hemiaster stella – type locality for species
 †Hemiaster ungula
 Hemimactra
 †Hemimactra solidissima
  Hemipristis
  †Hemipristis serra
  Heptranchias
 †Heptranchias howelli – type locality for species
 Hespererato
 †Hespererato emmonsi
 †Hesperhys
 †Hesperhys antiquus
 Heteropora
 †Heteropora tecta
  Hexanchus
 †Hexanchus ensis
 †Hexanchus microdon
 †Hexanchus primigenius
 Hiatella
  †Hiatella arctica
 †Hiatella myaeformis
 †Hiatella parilis
 †Histiophorus
 †Histiophorus homalorhamphus
 †Histiophorus parvulus – type locality for species
 †Holaster
 †Holaster cinctus – type locality for species
 Hydroides
 †Hydroides primitiva
 †Hypolophites
 †Hypolophites hutchinsi – type locality for species
 †Hypolophodon
 †Hypolophodon sylvestris
 †Hyposaurus – type locality for genus
 †Hyposaurus rogersii – type locality for species

I

 Ilyanassa
 †Ilyanassa obsoleta
 †Ilyanassa trivittata
 Ischadium
 †Ischadium recurvum
 †Ischnodactylus
 †Ischnodactylus cultellus
  †Ischyodus
 †Ischyodus williamsae
 †Ischyrhiza
 †Ischyrhiza mira
  Isognomon
 †Isognomon maxillata
  Isurus
 †Isurus acuminatus
 †Ixacanthus
 †Ixacanthus coelospondylus

K

 †Kapalmerella
 †Kapalmerella mortoni
 †Kummelia
 †Kummelia americana
 †Kummelia mortoni
 †Kummelonautilus
 †Kummelonautilus bryani
 †Kummelonautilus cookanus
 Kurtziella
 †Kurtziella cerina

L

 Laevicardium
 †Laevicardium mortoni
  Lamna
 †Lamna obliqua
  Latirus
 †Latirus angularis
 †Latirus perobesus
 †Latirus pleuricostatus
 †Lekythionia
 †Lekythionia dichotoma
 †Lembonax
 †Lembonax propylaeus – type locality for species
 Lemintina
 †Lemintina granifera
 †Leptomactra
 †Leptomactra delumbis
 Leptomaria – report made of unidentified related form or using admittedly obsolete nomenclature
 †Leptomaria pergranulosa
 Libinia
  †Libinia emarginata
 †Linthia
 †Linthia tumidula
 Lirophora
 †Lirophora latilirata
 Lithophaga
 †Lithophaga subalveata
 Littoraria
 †Littoraria irrorata
 †Longitubus
 Lunatia
 †Lunatia hemicrypta
 Lunularia
 †Lunularia reversa

M

 Macoma
 †Macoma balthica
 †Macoma calcarea
 Macrocallista
 †Macrocallista marylandica
 Macropora
 †Macropora aquiae
 Mactra
 †Mactra clathrodon
 †Mactra insulaemaris
 †Mammut
  †Mammut americanum
  †Mammuthus
 †Mariacolpus
 †Mariacolpus plebeia
 Marshallora
 †Marshallora nigrocincta
 †Marvacrassatella
 †Marvacrassatella melina
  †Megalonyx
 Melampus
 †Melampus bidentatus
  Melanella
 †Melanella eborea
 †Melanella retrocita
 †Melosia
 †Melosia staminea
 Membraniporella
 †Membraniporella crassula
 †Membraniporella modesta
 †Membraniporina
 †Membraniporina rimulata
 †Meniscopora
 †Meniscopora sultplana
  †Menoceras
 †Menoceras barbouri – or unidentified comparable form
 Mercenaria
 †Mercenaria campechiensis
 †Mercenaria ducatelli
 †Mercenaria mercenaria
 †Mercenaria plena
 Mesodesma
 †Mesodesma arctatum
 †Mesodesma deauratum
 Mitrella
 †Mitrella laevis
 Modiolus
 †Modiolus ducatellii
 †Modiolus johnsoni
  †Modiolus modiolus
 †Modiolus ovata
 †Modiolus ovatus
 †Modiolus subinflatus
 †Montlivaltia
 †Montlivaltia atlantica
 Morus
 †Morus atlanticus – type locality for species
 Mulinia
 †Mulinia lateralis
  Murex
 †Murex laevavaricosus
 †Murex millvillensis
 Murexiella
 †Murexiella cumberlandiana
 †Murexiella shilohensis
 †Muricidea
 †Muricidea burnsi
 †Mya
 †Mya arenaria
 †Mya producta
 †Myliobates
 †Myliobates bisulcus – type locality for species
  Myliobatis
 †Myliobatis dixoni – type locality for species
 †Myliobatis fastigiatus
 †Myliobatis jugosus
 †Myliobatis magister
 †Myliobatis obesus
 †Myliobatis striatus
 Mytilus
 †Mytilus edulis
 †Mytilus incurvus

N

  Nassarius
 †Nassarius acutus
 †Nassarius trivittatoides
 †Nassarius vibex
  Natica – or unidentified comparable form
 †Natica globulella
 Nemocardium
 †Nemocardium curtum
 †Nemodon
 †Nemodon brevifrons
 Neptunea
 †Neptunea lyrata
 †Neptunea stonei
  Neverita
 †Neverita duplicatus
 Nodosaria
 †Nodosaria zippei
 Notidanus
 †Notidanus primigenius
 Nucleolites
 †Nucleolites aequoreus
  Nucula
 †Nucula circe
 †Nucula major
 †Nucula proxima
 †Nucula secunda
 †Nucula sinaria
 Nuculana
 †Nuculana albaria
 †Nuculana cultelliformis
 †Nuculana liciata

O

 Odobenus
  †Odobenus rosmarus
  Odontaspis
 †Odontaspis macrota
 †Odontofusus – or unidentified comparable form
 †Odotus
 †Odotus obliquus
 †Oleneothyris
 †Oleneothyris harlani
 †Olenothyria
 †Olenothyria harlani
 †Olenothyris
 †Olenothyris harlani
 Olivella
 †Olivella mutica
 Ophiacantha – tentative report
 †Ophiocoma – tentative report
 †Ophiocoma senonensis
 Ophiomusium
 †Ophiomusium stephensoni
 †Ophiotitanos – tentative report
 †Ophiotitanos serrata
  Ostrea
 †Ostrea bryani
 †Ostrea compressirostra
 †Ostrea compressirostrea
 †Ostrea dissimilaris
 †Ostrea glandiformis
 †Ostrea glauconoides
 †Ostrea panda
 †Otodus
 †Otodus angustidens
  †Otodus megalodon
 Ovibos
  †Ovibos moschatus
 †Oxyrhina
 †Oxyrhina desorii
 †Oxyrhina minuta
 †Oxyrhina nova
 †Oxyrhina xiphiodon

P

  †Palaeocarcharodon
 †Palaeogaleus
 †Palaeogaleus vincenti
 †Palaeohypotodus
 †Palaeohypotodus rutoti
  †Palaeophis
 †Palaeophis grandis – type locality for species
 †Palaeophis halidanus – type locality for species
 †Palaeophis littoralis
 Paliurus
 †Paliurus triangularis
 Pandora
 †Pandora gouldiana
 †Pandora trilineata
 Panopea
 †Panopea elliptica
 †Panopea whifieldi
 Panopeus
 †Panopeus estellensis
 †Panopeus jerseyensis
 †Papillina
 †Papillina conradi
 †Papillina eocenica
 Parapholas
 †Parapholas kneiskerni
 †Partretocycloecia
 †Partretocycloecia dumosa
 Parvilucina
 †Parvilucina crenulata
 †Parvilucina prunus
 Pecten
 †Pecten humphreysii
 †Pecten madisonius
 †Pecten madisonus
 Penion – or unidentified comparable form
 †Penion multicostatus
  †Pentacrinites
 †Pentacrinites bryani
 †Pentacrinus
 †Pentacrinus bryani
 Periploma
 †Periploma peralta
 †Periplomya
 †Periplomya truncata
 †Perissolax
 †Perissolax trivolva
 †Perissolax trivolvus
 †Peritresius
 †Peritresius ornatus
  †Peronidella
 †Peronidella dichotoma
  Petricola
 †Petricola novaegyptica
 †Petricola pholadiformis
 †Phacodus – type locality for genus
 †Phacodus irregularis – type locality for species
 †Phasganodus
 †Phasganodus gentryi – type locality for species
  Phoca
 Phyllodus
 †Phyllodus curvidens
 †Phyllodus elegans – type locality for species
 †Phyllodus toliapicus – type locality for species
 Phyllonotus
 †Phyllonotus millvillensis
  Physeter
 †Physeter antiquus
 †Piestochilus
 †Piestochilus kanei
 Pinna
 †Pinna rostriformis
  Pitar
 †Pitar morrhuanus
 †Pitar ovalis
 †Pitar ovatus
 †Pitar veta
 †Pitar vetus
 †Plagiochasma
 †Plagiochasma crucifer
 Plagioecia
 †Plagioecia subramosa
 Platidia
 †Platidia cretacea
 Pleuromeris
 †Pleuromeris tridentata
  Pleurotomaria
 †Pleurotomaria brittoni
 †Pleurotomaria crotaloides
 †Pleurotomaria perlata
 †Pleurotomaria tintonensis
 †Pleurotrema
 †Pleurotrema solariforme
 †Pleurotrema solariformis
 Plicatula
 †Plicatula densata
 †Plicatula gibbosa
 †Plicatula inornata
 †Plinthicus
 †Plinthicus stenodon
  Polinices
 †Polinices triseriata
 †Polinices tuomeyi
 †Polorthus
 †Polorthus tibialis
 †Priscodelphinus
 †Priscodelphinus atropius
 †Priscodelphinus conradi
 †Priscodelphinus harlani – type locality for species
 †Priscodelphinus stenus
  Pristis
 †Pristis amblodon
 †Pristis brachyodon
 †Pristis curvidens
 †Prosynthetoceras
  Protula
 †Protula vincentownensis
  Psammechinus
 †Psammechinus cingulatus
 Pseudoliva
 Pteria – tentative report
 †Pteria annosa
 †Pterosphenus
 †Pterosphenus schucherti – or unidentified comparable form
  †Puppigerus
 †Puppigerus grandaevus
 Pycnodonte
 †Pycnodonte convexa
 †Pycnodonte dissimilaris
 †Pycnodonte percrassa
 Pyrgocythara
 †Pyrgocythara plicosa
 †Pyropsis

R

 Raeta
 †Raeta plicatella
 Ramphonotus
 †Ramphonotus laevis
 Rangia
 †Rangia cuneata
 Rangifer
 †Recurvaster
 †Recurvaster mammillatus
 †Rhetechelys
 †Rhetechelys platyops
  Rhinoptera
 †Rhizocrinus
 †Rhizocrinus cylindricus
  †Rhombodus
 †Rhopostoma
 †Rhopostoma crucifer – type locality for species
 †Rotularia
 †Rotularia rotula

S

 Salenia
 †Salenia tumidula – type locality for species
 Scalaria
 †Scalaria marylandica
 †Scalaria virginiana
 Scalpellum
 †Scalpellum conradi
  Scaphella
 †Scaphella biconica
 †Scaphella intermedia
 †Scaphella parvula
 †Scaphella perelevata
 †Scaphella scaphoides
  Scyliorhinus
 †Scyliorhinus gilberti
 Seila
 †Seila adamsii
 †Seila clavulus
 Semele
 †Semele burnsi
 †Semele johnsoni
 †Septastrea
 †Septastrea marylandica
  Serpula
 †Serpula habrogamma
 †Serpula howelli
 †Serpula jerseyensis
 †Serpula tristiata
 Serpulorbis
 †Serpulorbis granifera
  Sinum
 †Sinum fragile
 †Sinum perspectivum
 Siphonalia
 †Siphonalia devexus
 †Siphonalia johnsoni
 †Solarium
 †Solarium trilineatum
 Solenosteira
 †Solenosteira cancellaria
 Solidobalanus
 †Solyma
 †Solyma elliptica
 †Sphyraenodus
 †Sphyraenodus silovianus – type locality for species
 †Sphyraenodus speciosus
 Sportella
 †Sportella whitfieldi
  †Squalodon – type locality for genus
 †Squalodon atlanticus – type locality for species
 Squalus
 †Squalus minor
  Squatina
 †Stamenocella
 †Stamenocella cylindrica
 Stellatoma
 †Stellatoma stellata
  Stewartia
 †Stewartia anodonta
 Stramonita
 †Stramonita haemostoma
 Striarca
 †Striarca centenaria
  †Striatolamia
 Strioterebrum
 †Strioterebrum dislocatum
 Surculites
 †Surculites annosus
 †Surculites cadaverosus
 †Surculoma – tentative report
 †Surculoma perobesa

T

 Tagelus
 †Tagelus plebeius
 †Taphrosphys
 †Taphrosphys sulcatus
 †Tapiravus
 †Tapiravus validus
  Tapirus
 Tectonatica
 †Tectonatica pusilla
  Tellina
 †Tellina capillifera
 †Tellina declivis
 †Tellina peracuta
 Tenagodus – tentative report
 †Tenea
 †Tenea pinguis
 Teredo
 †Teredo emacerata
  †Thecachampsa
 †Thecachampsa antiqua
  †Thoracosaurus
 †Thoracosaurus basifissus
 †Thoracosaurus basitruncatus
 †Thoracosaurus neocesariensis
 Tibia
 †Tornatellaea
 †Tornatellaea bella
 †Tornatellaea lata
 †Trematofusus
 †Trematofusus venustus
 †Tretosphys
 †Tretosphys grandaevus – type locality for species
 †Tretosphys lacertosus
 †Tretosphys uraeus – type locality for species
  Trichechus
 Triphora
 †Triphora terebrata
 †Tritonopsis
 †Tritonopsis ecclesiastica
 Trochita
 †Trochita aperta
 Trochocyathus
 †Trochocyathus conoides
 †Trochosmilia – tentative report
 †Trochosmilia inauris
 Turbonilla
 †Turbonilla interrupta
 Turris – report made of unidentified related form or using admittedly obsolete nomenclature
 †Turris farmingdalensis
 Turritella
 †Turritella aequistriata
 †Turritella cumberlandia
 †Turritella secta
 †Turritella vertebroides
  Tylocidaris
 †Tylocidaris walcotti – type locality for species
  Tympanuchus
 †Tympanuchus lulli – type locality for species

U

 Urosalpinx
  †Urosalpinx cinerea

V

 †Veleda
 †Veleda equilatera
 Venericardia
 †Venericardia brittoni
 †Venericardia intermedia
 †Venericardia perantiqua
 †Veniella
 †Veniella decisa
 †Veniella rhomboidea
 Venus
 †Venus ducatellii
 †Venus submercenaria
 †Viperecucullus – type locality for genus
 †Viperecucullus kuehnei – type locality for species
 †Volutoderma
 †Volutomorpha
 †Volutomorpha conradi

W

 †Weltonia
 †Weltonia ancistrodon

X

 Xenophora
 †Xenophora lapiferens
  Xiphias
 †Xiphias antiquus
 Xiphodolamia – type locality for genus
 †Xiphodolamia enis
 †Xiphodolamia ensis – type locality for species

Y

 Yoldia
 †Yoldia laevis

Z

 †Zanthopsis
 †Zanthopsis milleri
 †Zarhachis
 †Zarhachis velox – type locality for species
  †Zygaena
 †Zygaena prisca

References
 

Cenozoic
New Jersey-related lists
New Jersey